Lysophosphatidylcholine acyltransferase 1 is a protein in humans that is encoded by the LPCAT1 gene.

Lysophosphatidylcholine (LPC) acyltransferase (LPCAT; EC 2.3.1.23) catalyzes the conversion of LPC to phosphatidylcholine (PC) in the remodeling pathway of PC biosynthesis.

References 

Genes on human chromosome 5